The Best American Poetry 2006, a volume in The Best American Poetry series, was edited by David Lehman (general editor), and poet Billy Collins, guest editor.

The volume received some negative reviews. A review in the RATTLE by G. Tod Stone stated that "[w]hat establishment-order literati like Lehman and Collins are succeeding in doing, more than anything else, is keeping American poetry from being the best." 

On the other hand, and more positively, James Owens wrote in the Pedestal Review that "[r]eaders who care about poetry need The Best American Poetry 2006. Get it. Read it. Just don’t stop there." ; writing in the Beloit Poetry Journal, Marion K. Stocking, remarked that "If a selection of the poets in Collins’s collection went on the road with their poems they should be reading to packed houses."

Poets and poems included

See also
 2006 in poetry

External links
 Best American Poetry 2006 Web page
 Best American Poetry Web site
  Marion K. Stocking's review in The Beloit Poetry Journal

Best American Poetry series
2006 poetry books
Poetry
American poetry anthologies